News, Views & Confused is a Pakistani political and social satire show. It is based on BBC’s popular panel show Have I Got News for You. It started to air on one of Pakistan’s leading TV channels AAJ TV from April 11, 2007. The show is hosted by TV personality and journalist Fasi Zaka and co-hosted by eccentric journalist and writer, Nadeem F. Paracha and fashion journalist, Mohsin Sayeed. It is scripted by George Fulton who is also the producer of the show.

The hosts of the show remain in character. Fasi Zaka is a witty democracy loving liberal, while Nadeem F. Paracha is the sardonic and cynical leftist with “quite authoritarian political views.” Mohsin Sayeed is the Fashion Journalist with an eye for social issues.

Second season  
At the successful culmination of the first season, the second season of the show began on August 4, 2007. For this season, Mariam Mukaty took over from George Fulton as producer. The script that was done by George, is now being handled by Mariam, Fasi Zaka and Nadeem F. Paracha. Nadeem Baig remained to be the show's director.
However, the last three episodes of the second season were produced by Assistant Producer, Sameera Eraehtram.

Third season 
The third season of the show began on March 17, 2008. 
Mariam Mukaty was replaced for the new season with former Assistant Producer of the show, Sameera Ehteram. 
Nadeem Baig who directed the first two seasons became Executive Producer while the direction of the show went to Suleman Arshad.  The script is now penned by host Fasi Zaka.

See also
George Ka Pakistan
AAJ TV
Have I Got News for You

External links
Aaj TV News, Views & Confused page
NVC Promo 1
NVC Promo 2
NVC Promo 3

Political satirical television series
Pakistani comedy television series